Sex segregation in Iran encompasses practices derived from the conservative dogma of Shiite Islam currently taking place in Iran. Most areas of the country are segregated by sex, except universities. In many cities, there are women parks. Sex segregation prohibits males from viewing females, and age of consent laws do not exist, as all sexual activity outside marriage is illegal.

After the Islamic Revolution in 1979 an emphasis on sex segregation of public places was increased. All schools are segregated by sex for students and their teachers. Beaches and pools are segregated by sex as requested by national law. Pre-marital relationships between boys and girls have been banned. Certain parts of Iranian society, primarily in wealthy urban neighborhoods, have accepted relationships between unmarried individuals.

Tehran metro has special wagons specific to females. In recent years males have often attempted to break the law, and in present times there have been cases of men entering female wagons.  There are many women-only parks all over the country and all beauty salons prohibit the entry of men and boys. Due to high sex segregation in the past, Iranian mothers typically chose a wife for their son, and largely continue to do so.

Reza Shah era
Reza Shah attempted to challenge the patriarchal structure of Iran by increasing visibility and mobility of women and to emancipate them from what he viewed as oppressive traditional practices. This included a repudiation of sex-segregation with an order made in 1936 that Tehran University enrol its first woman. Shah attempted to unveil the women of Iran. In 1929, he issued a law forcing Iranians to wear modern clothing and banning women from wearing the veil. A significant number of women from the middle class considered the abolishment of veils as freedom from oppression, however for others, the veil was not considered oppressive but protection from the eyes of strangers.

After the Islamic Revolution

When Ruhollah Khomeini called for women to attend public demonstration and ignore the night curfew, millions of women who would otherwise not have dreamt of leaving their homes without their husbands' and fathers' permission or presence, took to the streets. Khomeini's call to rise up against Mohammad Reza Shah took away any doubt in the minds of many devoted Muslim women about the propriety of taking to the streets during the day or at night.  After the Iranian revolution, however, Khomeini publicly announced his disapproval of mixing between the sexes.

Khomeini favored single-sex schools in his speech at the anniversary of the birth of Fatimah bint Muhammad, saying:

Sex segregation of public places such as beaches or swimming pools was ordered and legally introduced.

Adult males are not permitted to be in contact with females except under the presence of parents. They must intend to marry and until marriage are under parent control.

Bakeries

In bakeries across Iran, men and women must stand in separate lines when buying bread. This is for prevention of touching or looking at Non-mahrams. According to Islamic rules (basis of the constitution) in Iran, looking Non-mahram females is haram (religiously forbidden) whether they are real or on TV (just live). Looking a Non-Mahram is likened to a poisonous bullet shot from Satan in Islamic Sharia.

Urban buses
Buses are divided in two parts. Men are required to get on and off through the front door, while the back section and back doors are intended for women. Although bus services in Iran are sex-segregated, women are required to remain fully covered while inside the bus. In other cities such as in Mashhad, males and females were prevented from traveling on the same bus. Traditionally it is not acceptable in Iran for a man to sit or stand beside a non-mahram woman in public places.

In 2021, Tehran municipality announced that it has introduced female-only buses and minibuses inside the city. All the drivers are female and all the passengers should be female, no man is allowed to get on the bus.

Tehran metro
There are special wagons specific to females and, according to Metro laws, entrance of men in these wagons is illegal. Also according to Islamic penal codes, if a woman has an objection against a man, this is considered as female violence and has legal punishment.

Beaches
In 1979, officials calling the current situation of beaches as "idolatry" started to segregate beaches by sex. By the Caspian coasts, beaches were divided by sex. In the port of Bandare Anzali protesters continued to object for 3 months, but the governor Abolghasem Hosseinjani neglected them and divided the beach by 200 m segments named for men, for women and not suitable for swimming.

Kindergartens and schools
The education system is single-sex so that boys and girls go to different schools. Governmental rules don't allow the mingling of boys and girls in kindergartens.

Dress code
After the revolution, Parliament made it compulsory for all women to observe the veil and for the first time rules prescribing the Hijab as proper attire for women were written into the law.

According to the law, women's clothing should meet the following conditions:
 Women must cover their entire body except their faces and hands (from the wrist to the base of the fingers).
 Women who choose not to wear chador must wear a long overcoat or manteau. The manteau should be thick enough to conceal what is underneath, and should be loose-fitting.
 Women should not wear bright colored clothes or clothes that are adorned so that they may attract men's attention. In recent years, many women have begun wearing more colorful dresses in public and this seems to be tolerated by the moral police. Correspondingly, Iranians have been arrested or received warnings over bad hijabi ("improper veiling").

What follows is an excerpt from Ayatollah Khamenei's speech regarding bad-hijabi:

Iranian women are not required to wear chadors. Some do so, as wearing it is a claim to respectability and Islamic piety. However, women may also fulfill the government requirements for modest dress by wearing a combination of a headscarf and manteau.

Men are also concerned with veiling. Like women, men are not allowed to exhibit their legs or upper torso. Although wearing ties or bow-ties is not prohibited, since they are considered signs of western influence, they are not acceptable as an official norm. Wearing earrings is prohibited for men.

Other public places
After the 1979 Islamic Revolution, all swimming pools are segregated by sex legally. During early years after the revolution, Komiteh morality police used to prevent wedding ceremonies with sex mingling in outdoor gardens.

Supporters of sex segregation generally claim that experience has shown that presence of women and girls in public places and parks has caused much harassment for them while female-only places result in safety of girls and women and protects them from the opposite sex harassment.

Music concerts
Some concerts have been canceled in Iran because of mixed-gender seating during performance.

Amusement parks
In different cities there are amusement parks where men are not allowed to enter. These women-only parks are protected spaces where women can remain out of reach of men.

Sport events

Men are not allowed to see women's sport events and vice versa. Hosein Fekri, an official in sports affairs, in early years of Islamic revolution said: "We will create walls in any place women are doing sports in order to prevent men from watching even if it's a tennis yard".

The 2006 movie Offside is about the prohibition of women from the male-played sport of association football.

In 2019, after the death of Sahar Khodayari, Iranian authorities finally allowed select Iranian women to attend a football match in Iran's record 14-0 win against Cambodia for the first time since the Iranian Revolution. However, in March 2022, Iranian women were again banned from attending a World Cup qualifier.

Mosques and religious events
Mosques are sex-segregated and have different doors for each sex. As well as, religious committees for Muharram Mourning are sex-segregated.

Hospitals
Unsuccessful efforts have been made to run sex segregation in hospitals. Some women-only hospitals were constructed but were not successful. Men are prohibited to study in Obstetrics and Gynecology since Masoud Pezeshkian became Minister of Health.

Banks
Some women-only banks were constructed in different cities with women employees. After a period, men comprised most of the customers at these banks.

Ski reserves
General Hosein Sajedi-nia said police officers will prevent skiers in Tehran ski reserves from immoral behaviours. Police are involved in enhancing sex segregation between male and female skiers.

University campus and dormitories
Even though most universities are not segregated, university students must sit apart from each other by their sexes. All the thing in university campus are segregated by sex such as restaurants, libraries, study rooms, etc.

Entrance doors of Sharif University of Technology in Tehran are segregated by sex since 2022.

All university dormitories are unisex with exception of married students dormitories. Unisex dormitories (for either single or married students) can be male-only or female-only. As an example, Hafez university dormitory is one of the dormitories belonging to male students of University of Tehran while Fatemieh dormitory is one the dormitories belonging to female students of University of Tehran.

Police interference and punishing minglers
Since the revolution it has been concepted a duty for civil police to execute Sharia among people. In 2012, Ahmadi-Moghaddam, current chief police, stated that "sex segregation is not our policy but when a man and woman are dancing in a garden the police interferes because the garden proprietor has plighted not to let sex mingling in a public place".
In 2022 images of Sardar Talaie, ex-police chief of Tehran in social media were issued showing him exercising in a mixed gym. A turmoil started among Iranian people why the ex-commander of civil police who was responsible for confronting and punishing mingling of sexes is doing sport in a mixed gym in Canada.

Many cases of police action against sex mingling have been recorded. In 2015, police stopped a bus of tourists heading to the Maranjab Desert. All 32 passengers were arrested for sex mingling.

In 2012, Sharia police arrested 45 boys and girls going mountain climbing in the suburb of Mashhad. In 2016, police arrested 25 boys and girls with the average age of 25-35 who didn't have any familiar relationship and were together in a garden villa in Pardis County (around Tehran). The prosecutor convicted them of premarital sex and ordered to punish them.

Objections
Some consider sex segregation a positive thing. For example, Seyyed Mahmood Hoseini Dolatabadi an ex-parliament representative says "University is a place for education not for finding couple. University is supposed to be a place for catharsis and learning. We have such successful places for this aim like Islamic Hawzas. Furthermore sex-segregated universities are successful."

On the other hand, many authorities and sociologists in Iran are against sex segregation. Saeed Moeedfar an Iranian sociologist said in an interview with Fararu press: "Sex segregation policy forms negative reaction in the society. Attitudes of previous policy makers has caused abnormalities in the society and people don't pay attention to moral and ethic norms which obeyed before sex segregation any more."

Ali Jannati ex-minister of culture said in 2014: "We don't confirm sex-segregation of live concerts. Governmental cultural group doesn't agree with this idea and won't execute that because we consider it inappropriate for families."

During Mahsa Amini protests in 2022, in some universities like university of Tehran and Allameh Tabataba'i University male and female students chose to eat in the same place while mingling with each other as a demonstration of civil disobedience.

See also
 Women's rights movement in Iran
 Women's rights in Iran
 Gender apartheid
 Sex segregation and Islam
 Homosexuality in Iran
 Transgender rights in Iran

References

Further reading

History of the Islamic Republic of Iran
Sex segregation
History of civil rights and liberties in Iran
Sexism in Iran
Ruhollah Khomeini
Ali Khamenei
Human rights abuses in Iran
Women's rights in Iran
Sex segregation by country